In mathematics and logic, the term "uniqueness" refers to the property of being the one and only object satisfying a certain condition. This sort of quantification is known as uniqueness quantification or unique existential quantification, and is often denoted with the symbols "∃!" or "∃=1". For example, the formal statement

 

may be read as "there is exactly one natural number  such that ".

Proving uniqueness 

The most common technique to prove the unique existence of a certain object is to first prove the existence of the entity with the desired condition, and then to prove that any two such entities (say,  and ) must be equal to each other (i.e. ).

For example, to show that the equation  has exactly one solution, one would first start by establishing that at least one solution exists, namely 3; the proof of this part is simply the verification that the equation below holds:

That is,

By transitivity of equality,

Subtracting 2 from both sides then yields

In general, both existence (there exists at least one object) and uniqueness (there exists at most one object) must be proven, in order to conclude that there exists exactly one object satisfying a said condition.

Reduction to ordinary existential and universal quantification 
Uniqueness quantification can be expressed in terms of the existential and universal quantifiers of predicate logic, by defining the formula  to mean

which is logically equivalent to

An equivalent definition that separates the notions of existence and uniqueness into two clauses, at the expense of brevity, is

Another equivalent definition, which has the advantage of brevity, is

Generalizations 
The uniqueness quantification can be generalized into counting quantification (or numerical quantification). This includes both quantification of the form "exactly k objects exist such that …" as well as "infinitely many objects exist such that …" and "only finitely many objects exist such that…". The first of these forms is expressible using ordinary quantifiers, but the latter two cannot be expressed in ordinary first-order logic.

Uniqueness depends on a notion of equality. Loosening this to some coarser equivalence relation yields quantification of uniqueness up to that equivalence (under this framework, regular uniqueness is "uniqueness up to equality"). For example, many concepts in category theory are defined to be unique up to isomorphism.

The exclamation mark  can be also used as a separate quantification symbol, so , where .

See also 
 Essentially unique
 One-hot
 Singleton (mathematics)
 Uniqueness theorem

References

Bibliography 

 

Quantifier (logic)
1 (number)
Mathematical terminology
Uniqueness theorems